The Washington Campus Board of Directors is the governing body of The Washington Campus.

Current board members

Leadership
Chairman, Dr. Ash Soni, Executive Associate Dean for Academic Programs, Kelley School of Business Indiana University
Vice Chairman, The Honorable Bruce Mehlman, Esq., Founding Partner, Mehlman Castagnetti Rosen & Thomas

Consortium Board Members
Dr. Bradley Alge, Associate PRofessor of MAnagement, Krannert School of Management Purdue University
Dr. Shawn L. Berman, Associate Dean, The Anderson School of Management, The University of New Mexico
Professor Norman D. Bishara, Esq. Associate Dean for Undergraduate & Early Career Programs, Ross School of Business, The University of Michigan
Dr. S. Selcuk Erenguc, Senior Associate Dean, Warrington College of Business, University of Florida
Dr. Barron H. Harvey, Dean of School of Business, Howard University
Ms. Gail Justino-Miller, Associate Dean of Graduate Business Programs, D'Amore-McKim School of Business Northeastern University
Dr. Gerald D. Keim, Professor of Management and EMBA Faculty Director, W.P.Carey School of Business, Arizona State University
Dr. J.B. Kurish, Senior Associate Dean for Executive Education, Goizueta Business School, Emory University
Dr. Diana R. Lawson, Dean, Seidman College of Business, Grand Valley State University
Dr. Arvind Mahajan, Associate Dean for Graduate Programs, Mays Business School at Texas A&M University
Dr. Shashi Matta, Director of Full Time MBA and Working Professionals, Max M. Fisher College of Business, Ohio State University
Dr. David Vogel, Soloman P. Lee Chair in Business Ethics Haas School of Business at University of California, Berkeley
Dr. Timothy Werner, Associate Professor, Department of Business, Government & Society, McCombs School of Business, University of Texas at Austin
Dr. Duane Windsor, Lynette S. Autrey Professor of Management, Jones Graduate School of Business, Rice University

At-Large Board Members
Ms. Maya MacGuineas, President, Committee for a Responsible Federal Budget
Roger B. Porter, IBM Professor of Business and Government, Harvard Kennedy School, Harvard University
Dr. Michael D. Lord, President and CEO, The Washington Campus

Honorary Board Members
David R. Gergen, Director, Center for Public Leadership, Harvard Kennedy School, Harvard University

In Memoriam
The Honorable L. William Seidman, Founder, The Washington Campus

References

The Washington Campus
Washington Campus